Maysel is an unincorporated community in Clay County, West Virginia, United States. Maysel has a post office with ZIP code 25133.

The community was named after Maysel Kyle, the young daughter of a local merchant.

References

Unincorporated communities in Clay County, West Virginia
Unincorporated communities in West Virginia